The 2011 ITU Triathlon Team World Cup was held in Lausanne Switzerland on 21 August 2011. The championship was the sixth edition to be held and the third since the championships were reformatted in 2009; eliminating the separate male and female teams, running the championships with coed teams.

Format
Each team was allowed to enter 2 teams of four, made up of 2 females and 2 males. The teams competed in the following order of female–male–female–male. Each athlete completed a 265-metre swim, a 5 kilometre bike ride and a 1.2 kilometre run. Due to safety reasons the first athlete completed a longer, 500 metre swim instead.

Results
Since the reformatted event began, Switzerland came into the competition winning both previous championships. In 2011, they settled with the silver medal as Great Britain's team of 2008 World Champion Helen Jenkins, 2010 and 2011 World Sprint Champion Jonathan Brownlee, Jodie Stimpson and 2009 World Champion Alistair Brownlee took the title.

References

Team World Championships
2011 in Swiss sport
Triathlon competitions in Switzerland
International sports competitions hosted by Switzerland
Triathlon 2011